Porters Lake Water Aerodrome  is located  south of Porters Lake, Nova Scotia, Canada and is open from April to November.

See also
 Porters Lake Airport
 Porters Lake South Water Aerodrome

References

Registered aerodromes in Nova Scotia
Transport in Halifax, Nova Scotia
Seaplane bases in Nova Scotia